Elena Oprea (born 5 October 1953) is a retired Romanian rower. She competed in international events from 1971 to 1980, including the 1976 and 1980 Olympics. She won silver and bronze medals at European and World Rowing Championships in the women's eight and the coxless pair. At the 1976 Olympics, she came fourth in the coxed four and sixth in the women's eight. At the 1980 Olympics, she came fourth in the coxless pair.

References

External links
 
 

1953 births
Living people
Romanian female rowers
Rowers at the 1976 Summer Olympics
Rowers at the 1980 Summer Olympics
Olympic rowers of Romania
World Rowing Championships medalists for Romania
20th-century Romanian women